The Susquehanna and Tidewater Canal between Wrightsville, Pennsylvania, and Havre de Grace, Maryland, at the head of Chesapeake Bay, provided an interstate shipping alternative to 19th-century arks, rafts, and boats plying the difficult waters of the lower Susquehanna River. Built between 1836 and 1840, it ran  along the west bank of the river and rendered obsolete an older, shorter canal along the east bank. Although rivalry between Philadelphia, Pennsylvania, and Baltimore, Maryland, delayed its construction, the finished canal brought increased shipments of coal and other raw materials to both cities from Pennsylvania's interior. Competition from railroads was a large factor in the canal's decline after 1855. Canal remnants, including a lock keeper's house, have been preserved in Maryland, and locks 12 and 15 have been preserved in Pennsylvania.

A copy of a detailed survey blueprint of the entire canal system including structures and property ownership details was donated (date unknown) by the Safe Harbor Water Power Corporation to Millersville University (assessed on 10/06/2016 in the MU Archives at Sp. Coll. Map 386.409748 S128 Folio).  The survey consists of 67 pages, 98 x 30 cm. and is undated but the assumption is the original was created while the canal was in use. The assumed final page (68) which would be a survey of the final lock in Havre de Grace, MD is missing. An original copy (undated) of the survey is located in the Archives of Safe Harbor Dam as of 2022 (Brookfield Renewable). That document is also missing the final page 68.

The survey was completed in 1875 after the January 1, 1872 lease of the Canal to the Reading Railroad. Support for a date of the survey having being completed in 1875 include the fact that the John Bair Warehouse (now Tucquan Club) completed in 1879 (date stone in surviving building) was not on the survey (see map page 23). However, the York Furnace Bridge ruins are indicated.  The bridge was destroyed in 1856.  This suggests a date between 1856 and 1879.  

The confirmation comes from the biography of William H. Dechant of Reading.  See  Reading and Berks County, Pennsylvania: A History, Volume 3, page 198, Lewis Historical Pub. Co., New York, 1925, by Cyrus T. Fox.  Therein it specifically confirms that Mr Dechant, a young surveyor for  Reading Railroad, completed the survey in 1875 from Columbia, PA to Havre de Grace, MD.   Also see, The_Aegis_and_Intelligencer_Fri__Jul_30__1875, page where it states Mr Dechant finished a complete map of the canal to Havre de Grace in 1875.

History

Competition
In the 1820s, seeking raw materials from and trade with Pennsylvania's interior counties, residents of the large port city of Baltimore favored building a canal along the lower Susquehanna linking Chesapeake Bay to Pennsylvania's Main Line of Public Works at Columbia, Pennsylvania, across the river from Wrightsville. Residents of the rival port city of Philadelphia, fearing loss of trade to Baltimore, argued against the proposal. Since this was only  further by water than from Havre de Grace to Baltimore, the Susquehanna and Tidewater Canal stood to benefit both cities. In 1835, the Susquehanna Canal Company of Pennsylvania joined the Tidewater Canal Company of Maryland in privately funding and building the canal. Construction began in 1836 and was finished in 1840.

Debt
Despite toll collections rising from $42,000 in its first year to about four times that amount by 1850, the canal company faced money problems. Construction costs had totaled $3.5 million; with only $1.25 million in start-up capital, the company had borrowed heavily, and it struggled to pay its debts. After 1855, toll revenue fell; flood damage, railroad competition, and the disruptions of the Civil War hastened the decline. In 1872, the company sold its assets to the Philadelphia and Reading Railway Company, which used the canal to haul coal to Baltimore until 1894, during the Reading's first receivership (caused by the Panic of 1893). The Pennsylvania Railroad opened the Columbia and Port Deposit Railroad across the river in 1877.

Infrastructure, cargo
The canal had 29 locks overcoming  of elevation. At Wrightsville and the Columbia–Wrightsville canal basin, it connected with the Pennsylvania Canal's Eastern Division, part of the Main Line of Public Works. Cargo included coal, lumber, grain, and iron, much of it bound for Baltimore or Philadelphia. Boats passed through a weigh lock at York Furnace, where tolls were paid. Teams of mules walked on towpaths beside the canal and pulled the boats. At the upper terminus, across the river from Columbia, a wooden bridge with a two-tier tow path allowed mules going in opposite directions to cross the Susquehanna River simultaneously without colliding. From the canal outlet at Havre de Grace, tugs pulled the boats to Baltimore or other destinations. Mules on the Baltimore boats waited in Havre de Grace for the return journey, while boats bound for Philadelphia took their mules with them to use on the next towpath canal.

Earlier canal
Long before the opening of the Susquehanna and Tidewater Canal, the Maryland legislature of 1783, hoping to open a reliable trade route along the lower Susquehanna River, had granted a charter to a company of 40 men, mostly from Baltimore, to build a canal called the Susquehanna Canal.James Brindley (1745-1820) was the Chief Engineer for the project until it was suspended in 1786 for lack of funds. The Proprietors of the Susquehanna Canal, as the company was called, succeeded by 1802 in completing a canal of  along the east bank of the river from the Chesapeake Bay to the Pennsylvania state line.  The Proprietors hoped the Pennsylvania legislature would allow an extension on the other side of the state line; however, no canal below Columbia, Pennsylvania, was approved by Pennsylvania until after the opening in 1829 of the Chesapeake and Delaware Canal. It cut across the northern isthmus of the Delmarva Peninsula and made a lower Susquehanna canal more appealing to Philadelphia. A combination of high costs, faulty construction, and low revenues led the Proprietors to sell the Susquehanna Canal at a loss in 1817, and it was abandoned entirely in 1840 when the Susquehanna and Tidewater Canal opened on the opposite side of the river. The Susquehanna Canal was also known as the Port Deposit Canal or the Conowingo Canal, not to be confused with the Conewago Canal upstream near York Haven.

Remnants

The Susquehanna Museum in Havre de Grace has restored the lock house and other infrastructure at the southern terminus of the canal. On the Pennsylvania side, Lock #12 has been preserved by PPL along Pennsylvania Route 372 at the south end of the Norman Wood Bridge across the Susquehanna River. A footpath along the river leading from Lock 12 <39.813674, -76.328744> passes under highway Route 372 to the ruins of Locks 13. Lock 14 no longer exists. Preserved Lock 15 <39° 48.009'N 76° 18.481'W> is accessible by car 1.5 miles south of Lock 12 along River Road where can be found interpretive panels about the canal operation. Lock 11 (removed) was located at the spillway (kayak feature) of the Holtwood Dam.

Corporate successor
As a corporate entity, the corporation known as The Proprietors of the Susquehanna Canal still exists, having been purchased by the Philadelphia Electric Company, and now owned by its successor, Exelon. Its rights as a Maryland corporation, dating to 1783, allowed the construction of the Conowingo Dam.

Points of interest

See also
 List of canals in the United States

References

External links
 Pennsylvania Canal Society
 American Canal Society
 National Canal Museum

Canals in Pennsylvania
Canals in Maryland
Buildings and structures in Havre de Grace, Maryland
History of York County, Pennsylvania
Transportation buildings and structures in Harford County, Maryland
Transportation buildings and structures in York County, Pennsylvania
Exelon
Canals opened in 1840